Veruska Betania Ljubisavljević Rodríguez (born 2 January 1991) is a Venezuelan model and beauty pageant titleholder who was crowned Miss World Venezuela 2017. She represented the state of Vargas at the pageant and represented Venezuela at the Miss World 2018 competition.

Life and career

Early life
Ljubisavljević was born in Caracas of Serbian origin. Ljubisavljević graduated in Advertising and is a pastry chef by profession.

Pageantry
At the end of Miss Venezuela 2017 held on November 9, 2017, Ljubisavljević was crowned Miss World Venezuela 2017. She represented Venezuela in Miss World 2018, held in Sanya, China on December 8, 2018, placing in the top 30.

References

External links
Miss Venezuela Official Website

1991 births
Living people
Miss World 2018 delegates
Venezuelan beauty pageant winners
Venezuelan female models
Venezuelan people of Serbian descent